The Stihl Timbersports Series is a series of woodsman or wood chopping competitions where the athletes compete in the use of axes and saws in manners typical for lumberjacks. It was founded in 1985, and currently includes six different disciplines, with both professional and collegiate divisions. The terms 'timbersports' and 'timber sports' are trademarked by Stihl Inc.

History

Stihl Timbersports began in 1985, and the earliest broadcasts were made from a field in Wisconsin, United States, using a single camera on a forklift. At this time, there was no overall Series championship. Instead, awards were given for performances in individual events on venues around the country. Stihl, however, had a vision of a series that would bring the best athletes together and let them compete in several events and thus determine who was the best overall lumberjack.

With the help of Granite State Lumberjack Shows, the Series evolved and has become a very prestigious competition. Athletes from all around the world take part in the Series with European athletes taking part in the Series since 2005.

The Series has also spawned a college series, the Stihl Timbersports Collegiate Series, involving over 60 collegiate woodsman teams in the US and Canada. The winner of this series automatically receives a seed for next year's professional series.

The Canadian Series created their first Women's Professional Division in 2013. 2017 marks the creation of their first Women's Professional Division. 

The Series celebrated its 30th anniversary in the spring of 2015.

About
The Series involves both men and women competitors. There are currently three divisions: Men's Rookie Division, Men's Professional Division and Women's Professional Division. The three disciplines that are completed by the Pro Women's Division are Underhand Chop, Single Buck and Stock Saw. The four disciplines completed by the Men's Rookie Division are Underhand Chop, Standing Block Chop, Single Buck and Stock Saw. The six disciplines completed by the Men's Professional Division are Underhand Chop, Standing Block Chop, Spring Board, Single Buck, Hot Saw and Stock Saw. 

In order to be chosen as a Stihl Timbersports Athlete, one must fill out an application form and an athlete resume. The resume consists of the best times with each discipline. After the application process they choose the top eight athletes from the East Coast for each division and the top eight from the West Coast. The Men's Professional Division automatically move on to the National Championship. The Men's Rookie and the Women's Professional Division have Qualifier Competitions on each coast, where the result being the top four competitors from each division move onto the National Championship. The Men's and  Women's Professional Division does not have a maximum age limit. The Men's Rookie Division has a maximum age limit of 25. Currently there is not an established World Championship for the top female competitor. The men's divisions both compete for the top spot to move onto the World Men's Championship and the World Rookie Championship which is held in the European Union every fall. If one wins the World Rookie Division then one automatically must move up to compete in the Men's Professional Division. The Men's Professional Division also compete for spots on Team Canada to partake in the World Relay Champion's Trophy, also held in Europe every fall.

World records
Springboard - 35.67 seconds, set by Stirling Hart in 2016, with a wood diameter of 11"
Stock Saw - 9.445 seconds, set by Martin Komarek in 2010, with a wood diameter of 16"
Standing Block Chop - 12.11 seconds, set by Jason Wynyard in 2003, with a wood diameter of 12"
Underhand Chop - 12.28 seconds, set by David K. Bolstad in 1999, with a wood diameter of 13"
Single Buck - 9.395 seconds, set by Jason Wynyard in 2007, with a wood diameter of 19"
Hot Saw - 5.085 seconds, set by Matt Bush in 2003, with a wood diameter of 19"
Relay - 45.10 seconds, set by Australia in 2018 - teammates Brad De Losa, Brayden Meyer, Glen Gillam and Jamie Head

American records
Springboard - 39.96 seconds, set by Matt Bush in 2004, with a wood diameter of 11"
Stock Saw - 9.67 seconds, set by Logan Scarborough in 2015, with a wood diameter of 16"
Standing Block Chop - 13.15 seconds, set by Matt Bush in 2003, with a wood diameter of 12"
Underhand Chop - 13.78 seconds, set by Matt Cogar in 2017, with a wood diameter of 13"
Single Buck - 10.34 seconds, set by Dave Jewett in 2015, with a wood diameter of 19"
Hot Saw - 5.085 seconds, set by Matt Bush in 2003, with a wood diameter of 19"
Relay - 51.45 seconds, set by American teammates Jewett, Cogar, Lentz and Willard in 2015

Australian records
Springboard - 45.17 seconds, set by Brayden Meyer in 2017, with a wood diameter of 11"
Stock Saw - 11.45 seconds, set by Brad De Losa in 2016, with a wood diameter of 16"
Standing Block Chop - 14.10 seconds, set by Mitch Argent in 2017, with a wood diameter of 12"
Underhand Chop - 16.41 seconds, set by Glen Gilliam in 2019, with a wood diameter of 13"
Single Buck - 14.71 seconds, set by Brad De Losa in 2015, with a wood diameter of 19"
Hot Saw - 6.03 seconds, set by Brad De Losa in 2016, with a wood diameter of 19"

Canadian records 
Springboard - 35.67 seconds, set by Stirling Hart in 2016, with a wood diameter of 11"
Stock Saw - 11:87 seconds, set by Ben Cumberland in 2016, with a wood diameter of 16"
Standing Block Chop - 15:15 seconds, set by Nathan Cumberland in 2016, with a wood diameter of 12"
Underhand Chop - 20:60 seconds, set by Marcel Dupuis in 2016, with a wood diameter of 13"
Single Buck - 11:23 seconds, set by Ben Cumberland in 2016, with a wood diameter of 20"
Hot Saw - 9:04 seconds, set by Stirling Hart in 2016, with a wood diameter of 20"

Hall of Fame
Each year, starting in 2015, the Stihl Timbersports Series celebrates athletes who have made an impact in the sport by inducting them into the Timbersports Hall of Fame. Here are the inductees:
Carson Bosworth - 2016
Harry Burnsworth - 2016
Spike Milton - 2016
David Bolstad - 2015
Matt Bush - 2015
Rolin Eslinger - 2015

Television coverage
The Series is currently seen by over 20 million viewers annually on a variety of networks across 62 countries, including ABC, ESPN, Eurosport, Outdoor Channel, Stadium and more. It is recognized as the longest running show on ESPN other than SportsCenter. Tommy Sanders has served as on-air host of the American Series since 1992, whilst Dan Anstey has hosted the Australian edition since 2017.

Events
The Series currently involves six disciplines.
Springboard - The competitor uses two spring boards to ascend to the top of a nine-foot pole and chop a firmly attached 12" diameter block from the top of the pole. The block must be chopped from both sides.
STIHL Stock Saw - Competitors begin with both hands on the log. When the signal is given, the sawyers, using identical STIHL professional MS661 C-M chain saws with a 20-inch bar and 33RSC3 chain, make two cuts through identical logs. No more than 4" of wood, which is marked by a black line, can be cut.
Underhand Chop - The competitor stands, feet apart, on a 12"-14" log. At the signal, he  or she begins chopping through the log. Before chopping all the way through he  or she must turn and complete the cut from the other side. Time ends when the log is severed completely.
Single Buck - Competitors make one cut through 18"-20" of white pine using a single person cross cut saw. The competitor may have a helper to wedge the log and keep the saw lubricated. Time ends when the block is clearly severed.
Standing Block Chop - Competitors race to chop through 12"-14" of white pine. The competitor must chop from both sides of the log and the time ends when the block is severed.
Hot Saw - In this event the competitor uses a customized chain saw with a modified engine. At the signal, the competitor starts the saw and makes three cuts. The competitor must cut no more than 6" from the log which is marked with a black line.

Timbersports Champions
Each year across the US and world, Timbersports athletes battle to be named series champion. The Timbersports Series champions since the competition's inception are:

Series Champions
1985 -  Mike Sullivan
1986 -  Mel Lentz
1987 -  Rolin Eslinger
1988 -  Mel Lentz
1989 -  Rolin Eslinger
1990 -  Mel Lentz
1991 -  Mel Lentz
1992 -  Mel Lentz
1993 -  Rolin Eslinger
1994 -  Matt Bush
1995 -  Mel Lentz
1996 -  Harry Burnsworth
1997 -  Jason Wynyard
1998 -  Jason Wynyard
1999 -  Jason Wynyard
2000 -  Jason Wynyard
2001 -  David Bolstad
2002 -  Jason Wynyard
2003 -  David Bolstad
2004 -  David Bolstad
2005 -  Matt Bush
2006 -  Jason Wynyard
2007 -  David Bolstad
2008 -  David Bolstad
2009 -  Jason Wynyard
2010 -  Jason Wynyard
2011 -  Jason Wynyard
2012 -  Jason Wynyard
2013 -  Brad De Losa
2014 -  Jason Wynyard
2015 -  Jason Wynyard
2016 -  Jason Wynyard
2017 -  Jason Wynyard
2018 -  Laurence O'Toole
2019 -  Brayden Meyer

World Relay Champions
2010 -  New Zealand 
2011 -  Australia 
2012 -  New Zealand 
2013 -  New Zealand
2014 -  
Australia
2015 -  Australia
2016 -  Australia
2017 -  New Zealand
2018 - 
Australia
2019 - 
Australia

World Rookie Champions
 2014 -  Nathan Cumberland
 2015 -  Ben Cumberland
 2016 -  Ben Cumberland
 2017 -  Ferry Svan
 2018 -  Daniel Gurr

United States Champion 
 2008 -  Arden Cogar Jr.
 2009 -  Arden Cogar Jr.
 2010 -  Arden Cogar Jr.
 2011 -  Melvin Lentz
 2012 -  Arden Cogar Jr.
 2013 -  Matt Cogar
 2014 -  Matt Cogar
 2015 -  Matt Cogar
 2016 -  Matt Cogar
 2017 -  Matt Cogar
 2018 -  Matt Cogar

Canadian Champion 
 2005 -  J.P. Mercier
 2007 -  J.P. Mercier
 2014 -  Stirling Hart
 2015 -  Marcel Dupuis
 2016 -  Stirling Hart
 2017 -  Mitch Hewitt
 2018 -  Nathan Cumberland

British Champion 
 2015 -  Elgan Pugh
 2016 -  Elgan Pugh
 2017 -  Elgan Pugh 
 2018 -  Elgan Pugh

European Champion 
 2002 -  Thomas Gerber
 2003 -  Martin Komarek
 2004 -  Martin Komarek
 2005 -  Martin Komarek
 2006 -  Martin Komarek
 2007 -  Dirk Braun
 2008 -  Dirk Braun

European Champion crew 
 2004 - 
 2005 - 
 2006 - 
 2007 - 
 2008 -

Canadian Men's Rookie Champion 
 2014 -  Nathan Cumberland
 2015 -  Ben Cumberland
 2016 -  George Williams
 2017 -  Thomas Henderson
 2018 -  Connor Morse

Canadian's Women's Champion 
 2015 -  Janet Walker
 2016 -  Caitlin Carroll
 2017 -  Kelly Bowness
 2018 -  Anita Jezowski

See also 
 World Logging Championship

References

External links

STIHL TIMBERSPORTS
STIHL TIMBERSPORTS USA
STIHL TIMBERSPORTS Australia
Hall of Fame

Logging
Lumberjack sports
Lumberjack sports players
Forestry events
Recurring events established in 1985